The Europe Zone was one of the three regional zones of the 1967 Davis Cup.

32 teams entered the Europe Zone, competing across 2 sub-zones. The winners of each sub-zone went on to compete in the Inter-Zonal Zone against the winners of the America Zone and Eastern Zone.

Spain defeated the Soviet Union in the Zone A final, and South Africa defeated Brazil in the Zone B final, resulting in both Spain and South Africa progressing to the Inter-Zonal Zone.

Zone A

Draw

First round

Bulgaria vs. Portugal

Great Britain vs. Canada

Romania vs. Belgium

Spain vs. Egypt

Switzerland vs. Greece

Czechoslovakia vs. Chile

Finland vs. Denmark

West Germany vs. Soviet Union

Quarterfinals

Bulgaria vs. Great Britain

Romania vs. Spain

Greece vs. Chile

Denmark vs. Soviet Union

Semifinals

Great Britain vs. Spain

Soviet Union vs. Chile

Final

Spain vs. Soviet Union

Zone B

Draw

First round

France vs. Norway

Hungary vs. Sweden

Monaco vs. Turkey

Netherlands vs. South Africa

Italy vs. Austria

Luxembourg vs. Ireland

Poland vs. Israel

Yugoslavia vs. Brazil

Quarterfinals

France vs. Hungary

Monaco vs. South Africa

Italy vs. Luxembourg

Poland vs. Brazil

Semifinals

France vs. South Africa

Italy vs. Brazil

Final

South Africa vs. Brazil

References

External links
Davis Cup official website

Davis Cup Europe/Africa Zone
Europe Zone
Davis Cup